A Universal Card is an electronic card with the same form factor as a magnetic stripe card. It is capable of emulating any magnetic stripe data card that is stored either in the card, or on a smart phone that communicates with it. It benefits the consumer by consolidating their credit, debit, membership, loyalty, gift cards and other forms of magnetic stripe data cards into one card. Certain universal card products also add an extra layer of security to protect their cards against theft.

History 

The universal card movement began when near field communication-based mobile wallet solutions failed to gain ground and presented numerous difficulties, the two biggest being the cost of replacing hardware at the merchants point of sale and customers needing a near field communication-capable phone. Since  financial blunder with their Geode card in mid-2012, there have been many new companies trying to perfect and capitalize on a universal card type product.

Escardgot Inc was founded in October 2011, and since then have been quietly building their prototype in the background. They are notable for having a working prototype that was demonstrated in front of a live audience at FinovateSpring 2013. While other notable players in the field are still patent-pending, Escardgot's HELIX card already has patents on its technology (US Patent: 8,313,037; US Patent: 8,376,239).

The Coin card entered into the market with hype and targeted ads, immediately opening up their own crowd sourcing page for customers to sign up to pre-order a card ahead of its release in 2014. Another company, Protean, also created a lot of buzz for their product, before its release date, following the path of Geode.

Types 

The main distinguishing feature of the universal card is its capability of reprogramming its magnetic stripe internally, to mimic the data stored on another card. The handful of start ups with a universal card type product have found different ways of achieving this, leading to different complexities and capabilities of the universal card.

Universal cards either store data within the form factor, or within a device such as a smart phone that communicates with the card via Bluetooth. Escardgot's Helix, Protean's Echo, and Omne all have respective apps for smart phones that stores a potentially limitless number of the user's cards. Coin stores up to eight cards in a microchip inside the card itself. To scan the user's data, all of them either require manual input into a smartphone app or a use of a mini card scanner that plugs into the phone's headphone jack.

See also 

Digital wallet

References 

Storage media